Simon Becher (born July 20, 1999) is an American professional soccer player who plays as a forward for Major League Soccer club Vancouver Whitecaps FC.

Highschool
Becher attended The Woodstock Academy in Woodstock,Connecticut he graduated in 2018.

College career 
Becher appeared in 47 games at Saint Louis University and during that time he scored 21 goals and had 13 assists. At the end of his collegiate career, he was named Saint Louis University's Most Outstanding Male Athlete.

Club career 
In January 2022, Becher was drafted by the Whitecaps in the 1st round (16th pick) of the 2022 MLS SuperDraft. He was then signed by Vancouver to play for their MLS Next Pro side.

On August 6, 2022, he made his MLS debut for Vancouver as a 82nd substitute for Javain Brown. He went on to score one goal as an equalizer.

Becher made the permanent move to Vancouver's MLS roster on November 17, 2022.

References

Living people
1999 births
All-American men's college soccer players
American soccer players
Whitecaps FC 2 players
Vancouver Whitecaps FC players
Expatriate soccer players in Canada
American expatriate sportspeople in Canada
MLS Next Pro players
Major League Soccer players
Saint Louis Billikens men's soccer players
Soccer players from Kansas
Ocean City Nor'easters players
Reading United A.C. players
USL League Two players
Vancouver Whitecaps FC draft picks